Macaranga raivavaeensis is a species of plant in the family Euphorbiaceae. It is endemic to French Polynesia.

References

Flora of French Polynesia
raivavaeensis
Critically endangered plants
Taxonomy articles created by Polbot